Milk immunity is the protection provided to immune system of an infant via the biologically active components in milk, typically provided by the infant's mother.

Mammalian milk 

All mammalian milk contains water, sugar, fat, vitamins, and protein with the variation within and between species and individuals differing mainly in the amount of these components. Other than the variation in quantity of these components, not a lot is known about bio-active or immune-modulating factors in many mammalian species. However, in comparison to other mammalian milk, human milk has the most oligosaccharide diversity.

Bovine milk 
Ruminant mothers do not transfer immunity to their infants during pregnancy, which makes milk the first introduction to maternal immunity calves receive. Bovine milk contains both immunoglobulins A and G, but in contrast to human milk where IgA is the most abundant, IgG is more abundant. Secretory Component, IgM, both anti-inflammatory and inflammatory cytokines, and other proteins with antimicrobial functions are also present in bovine milk.

Human milk

Avian crop milk 
Crop milk is a secretion from the crop of a bird that is regurgitated to feed their offspring. Birds that produce this secretion include pigeons, flamingos, emperor penguins, and doves. Pigeon milk contains some immune-modulating factors such as microbes and IgA, as well as other components with similar biological activities to mammalian milk including pigeon growth factor, and transferrin.

References 

Breastfeeding
Immunology
Milk